is a Japanese professional footballer for Fagiano Okayama.

Club career
After attending Funabashi Municipal High School, Fukumoto signed for Fagiano Okayama for 2018 season.

Club statistics
Updated to 29 August 2018.

References

External links

Profile at J. League

1999 births
Living people
Association football people from Kanagawa Prefecture
Japanese footballers
Fagiano Okayama players
J2 League players
Association football forwards